is a Japanese footballer who plays as a defensive midfielder for Celtic, on loan from Yokohama F. Marinos, and for the Japan national team.

Club career

Oita Trinita 
Iwata began his youth career with Oita Trinita in 2015, before signing professionally the following year, in 2016.

Yokohama F. Marinos 
In 2021, Iwata signed for J1 club, Yokohama F. Marinos. On 5 November 2022, he led the club to the 2022 J1 League title. 2 days later, he was named among the Best XI of the season and also voted Player of the Year.

Celtic 
On 30 December 2022, Iwata signed for Scottish Premiership side Celtic on an initial loan deal with a compulsory option to buy from Yokohama F. Marinos. This has seen Iwata reunited with his former Yokohama manager, Ange Postecoglou.

On 21 January 2023, Iwata made his debut for the club in a 5–0 win against Greenock Morton in the Scottish Cup.

International career
On May 24, 2019, Iwata was called up by Japan's head coach Hajime Moriyasu to feature in the Copa América played in Brazil. He made his debut on 20 June 2019 in the game against Uruguay, as a starter.

Career statistics
.

Club

International

Honours
Yokohama F. Marinos
 J1 League: 2022
Celtic

 Scottish League Cup: 2022–23

Individual
J.League MVP Award: 2022
J.League Best XI: 2022

References

External links
 
 
 Profile at Oita Trinita
 
 

1997 births
Living people
Association football people from Ōita Prefecture
Japanese footballers
Japan youth international footballers
Japan under-20 international footballers
Japan international footballers
J1 League players
J2 League players
J3 League players
Oita Trinita players
Yokohama F. Marinos players
Association football midfielders
2019 Copa América players
J1 League Player of the Year winners
Celtic F.C. players
Japanese expatriate footballers
Expatriate footballers in Scotland
Japanese expatriate sportspeople in Scotland